Girkenroth is an Ortsgemeinde – a community belonging to a Verbandsgemeinde – in the Westerwaldkreis in Rhineland-Palatinate, Germany.

Geography

Girkenroth lies 7 km south of Westerburg at the foot of the Watzenhahn woodland. Since 1972 it has belonged to what was then the newly founded Verbandsgemeinde of Westerburg, a kind of collective municipality.

History
In 1516, Girkenroth had its first documentary mention as Gergerode.

Politics
The council is made up of 13 council members, including the extraofficial mayor (Bürgermeister), who were elected in a majority vote in a municipal election on 13 June 2004.

Coat of arms
The three blue bends on a golden background come from the arms formerly borne by the lesser noble family of Ottenstein, whose seat, albeit already forsaken in the 14th century, lay within Girkenroth's current limits. A field's name still recalls this seat. In the village itself the von Ottensteins had property in the Late Middle Ages and early modern times.

The background tincture green refers to the woodlands growing around the community and the pasture farming that is important here to this day (there was a communal livestock herd until the 1960s). Agriculture, as the most important basis for food production into the 20th century, is also symbolized by the golden grain ear. The three basalt columns on a silver background are said to stand for the Watzenhahn basalt massif at whose foot Girkenroth lies. In this century, local quarrying has become an important source of income for the inhabitants.

Economy and infrastructure

South of the community runs Bundesstraße 8 leading from Limburg an der Lahn to Siegburg. The nearest Autobahn interchange is Diez on the A 3 (Cologne–Frankfurt). The nearest InterCityExpress stop is the railway station at Montabaur on the Cologne-Frankfurt high-speed rail line.

References

External links
Girkenroth 
Girkenroth in the collective municipality’s Web pages 

Municipalities in Rhineland-Palatinate
Westerwaldkreis